Christmas Kisses may refer to:

Music
Christmas Kisses (EP), an EP by Ariana Grande
Christmas Kisses (album), a 2018 album by Serena Ryder

Song
"Christmas Kisses" (The Bookends song) (1961)
"Christmas Kisses", a 2012 song by Boz Boorer
"Christmas Kisses", a song by Paul McCartney from Kisses on the Bottom

Other uses
Christmas Kisses, a 1996 book by Linda Howard with Debbie Macomber and Linda Turner